The Wheels of Chance is a 1922 British silent comedy drama film directed by Harold M. Shaw and starring George K. Arthur, Olwen Roose and Gordon Parker. It was based on the 1896 novel The Wheels of Chance by H.G. Wells, and was mostly filmed at the locations in Hampshire and Sussex specified by Wells. The interiors were partly filmed in the hotels named in the novel, with a very few interiors taken at Stoll Pictures' Cricklewood plant. In addition, many of the film's titles are taken directly from Wells' text. This film was the second Wells adaptation Shaw directed with George K. Arthur in the principal role; the first was Kipps (1921).

Cast
 George K. Arthur - Hoopdriver
 Olwen Roose - Jessie Milton
 Gordon Parker - Bechamel
 Bertie Wright - Briggs
 Mabel Archdale - Mrs. Milton
 Judd Green - Wickens
 Wallace Bosco - Dayle
 Clifford Marle - Phipps

References

External links

1922 films
1922 comedy-drama films
Films directed by Harold M. Shaw
Films based on works by H. G. Wells
British comedy-drama films
Cycling films
Films set in London
Films set in England
British silent feature films
British black-and-white films
1920s English-language films
1920s British films
Silent comedy-drama films